Jean-Jacques Subrenat (born 1940) is a French diplomat who served as ambassador, permanent representative to the Western European Union in Brussels (1995–1998), ambassador to Estonia (1998–2002) and to Finland (2002–2005). He represented France at the Board of Governors of the Asia-Europe Foundation (ASEF) in 2005. He retired from the diplomatic service in September 2005. Speaks, debates and writes on international relations, European Union affairs, Asia, defence and security, global trends and challenges, Internet governance. A member of the At-Large Advisory Committee (2010~12, again 2012–14) (ALAC) of the Internet Corporation for Assigned Names and Numbers (ICANN). Currently a member of the IANA Stewardship Transition Coordination Group (ICG). Member of the NetMundial Initiative Coordination Council (since December 2014).

Chairman of the Advisory Board (2007~09) of "Institut Pierre Werner"  in Luxemburg. Tutor at ENA (Ecole nationale d'administration) in Strasbourg (2007~08). Member of the Board of Directors, [ICANN] (2007–2010). Special adviser to the Board of "Centre culturel et de rencontre Neumunster" (CCRN) in Luxembourg (2009–2010), which he represented on the Board of European Union National Institutes for Culture (EUNIC) (2008–2010). At EUNIC, he was a member of the organizing committee of the "Europe-China Cultural Dialogue 中欧文化对话 (Zhong-Ou wenhua duihua), also serving as keynote speaker and moderator in the first three sessions of this Dialogue (Beijing 2009, Copenhagen 2010, Shanghai 2011).

Professional history 
He served as a volunteer in the French Navy (1960–63), was a scholarship student in Bordeaux and Paris (1963–68) and worked as a research fellow at the Centre national de la recherche scientifique, CNRS from 1967 to 1971.

After entering the diplomatic service in 1972, he served at the French Ministry of foreign affairs in Paris (policy planning staff, administration and personnel, directorate for Asia and the Pacific, development cooperation, directorate for the Americas), and in several French embassies including as secretary in Singapore and counsellor and later minister-counsellor in Tokyo.

Books published 
 Initiator and Editor of "Estonia, identity and independence", published by Rodopi, Amsterdam and New York, 2004 ; also published, under his pen name A. Bertricau, in Estonian  and Russian  by Avita, Tallinn 2001; and in French, "Estonie, identité et indépendance" by L'Harmattan, Paris 2002 
 Listen, there's music from the forest: a short presentation of the Kuhmo Chamber Music Festival, in English and French, by Jean-Jacques Subrenat, .

Articles & interviews 
A brief selection:
"Tunis, Cairo... Teheran? Algiers? Manama? Damascus?"
"Thoughts on the Nobel Peace Prize 2010"
"Letter to a friend in the United States"
"Mumbai: the aftermath / les suites"
"Financial turmoil: worldwide risk, or US meltdown? / Désordre financier : risque mondial, ou déliquescence des Etats-Unis ?"
"The EU in its neighborhood / L'UE dans son voisinage"
"Chongqing, world city? / ville mondiale ?"

References

External links

ICANN Wiki
ICANN, former members of the Board 

1940 births
Ambassadors of France to Finland
Ambassadors of France to Estonia
Living people
Recipients of the Order of the Cross of Terra Mariana, 1st Class
French expatriates in Singapore
French expatriates in Japan